Luis Celedón (born 16 December 1926) was a Chilean long-distance runner. He competed in the marathon at the 1952 Summer Olympics.

References

External links
 

1926 births
Possibly living people
Athletes (track and field) at the 1952 Summer Olympics
Chilean male long-distance runners
Chilean male marathon runners
Olympic athletes of Chile